Ghāzīābād is a District in Kunar Province, in eastern Afghanistan. Named after the khan of Ghaziabad, Amir Muhammad Ghazi Khan Shaheed.

References

Populated places in Kunar Province